Dorf Mecklenburg station is a railway station in the municipality of Dorf Mecklenburg, located in the Nordwestmecklenburg district in Mecklenburg-Vorpommern, Germany.

References

Railway stations in Mecklenburg-Western Pomerania
Buildings and structures in Nordwestmecklenburg